XHLAYA-FM is a noncommercial radio station in Playa del Carmen, Quintana Roo. Broadcasting on 106.3 FM, XHLAYA is owned by Gaia FM, A.C.

History

The permit for XHLAYA was awarded on January 11, 2012, to Gaia FM, A.C., along with additional permits for stations in Colima, Colima (XHOMA-FM), Puerto Vallarta (XHGAI-FM) and Cancún (XHCQR-FM).

In 2015, Gaia FM, A.C. was subsumed into CapitalMedia, which is a commercial radio station owner. The stations kept their format with a name change to Capital Pirata FM. In a 2018 filing with the IFT, Capital declared that it did not directly operate the Gaia FM stations but instead provided them with less than five percent of their broadcast day in news capsules and other material.

Like most Capital stations, XHLAYA adopted the new Lokura FM adult hits format in 2020.

References

Radio stations in Quintana Roo